The following is a list of festivals in Portugal.

By type

Film festivals
Black & White Festival (2004-) - Porto
Caminhos do Cinema Português - Coimbra
Curtas Vila do Conde (1993-) - Vila do Conde
Doclisboa - Lisbon
Douro Film Harvest
Estoril Film Festival - Estoril
Fantasporto - Porto
FEST New Directors New Films Festival (2004-) - Espinho
Festroia International Film Festival (1985-) - Setúbal
Lisbon Gay & Lesbian Film Festival (1997-) - Lisbon
Olhares do Mediterrâneo - Cinema no Feminino (2014-) - Lisbon

Music festivals
Avante! Festival (1976-) - Amora, Seixal
Boom Festival (1997-) - Idanha-a-Nova
Cascais Jazz Festival (1971-1988) - Cascais
Festival da Canção (1964-)
Festival Forte (2014-) - Montemor-o-Velho
Festival Sudoeste (1997-) - Zambujeira do Mar
FMM Sines – Festival Músicas do Mundo (1999-) - Sines
Laurus Nobilis Music Famalicão (2015-) - Vila Nova de Famalicão
NOS Alive (2007-) - Algés (Oeiras)
NOS Primavera Sound (2012-) - Porto
Paredes de Coura Festival (1993-) - Paredes de Coura
Rock in Rio - Lisbon
Super Bock Super Rock (1994-)
Vilar de Mouros Festival (1971-) - Vilar de Mouros
Vagos Open Air (2009-) - Calvão (Vagos)

By location
The following is a list of Portuguese festivals held in only one or a few of the Districts and/or Autonomous Regions of Portugal. Nationwide festivals are not included.

Aveiro
FEST New Directors New Films Festival (2004-) - Espinho
Vagos Open Air (2009-) - Calvão (Vagos)

Azores
 Festas do Senhor Santo Cristo dos Milagres in Ponta Delgada
 Festas do Divino Espírito Santo

Beja
Festival Sudoeste (1997-) - Zambujeira do Mar

Braga
Anjo Festival

Bragança
Careto - Podence (Macedo de Cavaleiros)

Castelo Branco
Boom Festival (1997-) - Idanha-a-Nova

Coimbra
Caminhos do Cinema Português - Coimbra
Festival Forte (2014-) - Montemor-o-Velho

Évora

Faro
Craft, Tourism, Agricultural, Commercial and Industrial Fair of Lagoa (1980-) - Lagoa
International Sand Sculpture Festival (2003-ongoing) - Pêra (Silves)

Guarda

Leiria

Lisbon
Doclisboa - Lisbon
Estoril Film Festival - Estoril
Lisbon Book Fair - Lisbon
Lisbon Gay & Lesbian Film Festival (1997-) - Lisbon
Ludopolis (2012-) - Lisbon
NOS Alive (2007-) - Algés (Oeiras)
Olhares do Mediterrâneo - Cinema no Feminino (2014-) - Lisbon
Rock in Rio - Lisbon

Madeira

Portalegre

Porto
Anjo Festival
Black & White Festival (2004-) - Porto
Curtas Vila do Conde (1993-) - Vila do Conde
Fantasporto - Porto
Festa de São João do Porto - Porto
Festivals of Póvoa de Varzim - Póvoa de Varzim
NOS Primavera Sound (2012-) - Porto

Porto Pride (2001-) - Porto
Póvoa de Varzim Holiday - Póvoa de Varzim
Romaria de S. Gonçalo e S. Cristóvão (17th century-) - Vila Nova de Gaia
Festa de S. Pedro da Afurada - Vila Nova de Gaia
Festa da Nossa Senhora da Saúde - Vila Nova de Gaia

Santarém
Festa dos Tabuleiros - Tomar

Setúbal
Avante! Festival (1976-) - Amora, Seixal
Festroia International Film Festival (1985-) - Setúbal
FMM Sines – Festival Músicas do Mundo (1999-) - Sines

Viana do Castelo
Paredes de Coura Festival (1993-) - Paredes de Coura
Vilar de Mouros Festival (1971-) - Vilar de Mouros
Neopop (2006-) - Viana do Castelo

Vila Real
 Rock Nordeste

Viseu

See also
Sarau (event)

Festivals
Portugal
Portugal